Elections to Nairn District Council were held in May 1988, the same day as the other Scottish local government elections.

Turnout was 48.3% in contested wards. Of the 10 wards, 5 were uncontested.

Election results

Ward results

References

1988 Scottish local elections
1988